The Battle of Ardnocher or Ardnurcher was fought in Ireland on 10 August 1329 between the Normans and the MacGeoghegans of Cenel Fiachaigh or Kenaleagh in modern County Westmeath. The Norman force was defeated. The Annales Hiberniae records that on 10 August 1329, Norman forces led by Thomas le Botiller (Butler) attacked the fort of Ardnurcher (now the village of Horseleap) but were defeated by William Gallda MacGeoghegan. It says that le Botiller was killed along with several others of high rank and 140 soldiers. The Annals of the Four Masters offers a different account, giving the date as 1328 and saying that 3,500 Normans were killed.

See also

 Battle of Druim Dearg, 1260AD
 Battle of Ath an Chip, 1270AD

References

Ardnocher
Ardnocher
1329 in Ireland
Ardnocher
History of County Westmeath